in Aichi Prefecture is a Japanese actor. He debuted as an actor in V-cinema in 2001, and made his theatrical film debut in 2003 in Azumi. His first main lead starring role was in the tokusatsu television series Madan Senki Ryukendo in 2006, which was a major breakthrough and made him rise to worldwide fame, and is also considered to be his best and most memorable performance to date. In 2008, he was selected from an audition of 500 actors to play the male lead against the heroine in the NHK Asadora Dandan. His other notable roles are in the movie Parazoku: Parapara ja Naika (2006) and the television series Hanchō.

Personal life 

Yamaguchi lives with his two beloved cats, Ichimaru and Bo. He is an ardent supporter of the football club Arsenal F.C. He is also actively involved with several theatre and stage plays.

Yamaguchi also continues to maintain a great friendship with Gen & Kouhei Kuroda, who were his co-stars from Madan Senki Ryukendo and played Fudou and Koichi in the show respectively. The three are known to get together every now and then till present day.

Yamaguchi is a painter and craftsman by hobby, often sharing his creations through social media accounts.

Filmography

Television

TV serials 
 AIBOU: Tokyo Detective Duo (2000–2019), Character name unknown
 Madan Senki Ryukendo (2006), Narukami Kenji aka Ryukendo
 Kobayakawa Nobuki no koi (2006), Jun Kanai
 Kekkon shiki he ikô! (2006–2007), Character name unknown
 Mop Girl(2007), Ozaki Hikaru
 Asadora:Dandan (2008–2009), Male lead; name unknown
 Hanchô: Jinnansho Azumihan (2009–2011), Taichirou Sakurai
 Honjitsu wa Taian Nari (2012), Yuki Yamada
 Naru yô ni Naru sa (2013–2014), Character name unknown
 Tachibana Noboru Seishun Tebikae (2016–2017), Seikichi
 CRISIS: Special Security Squad (2017), Character name unknown
 Massage Tantei Joe (2017), Harima
 Okusama Wa Toriatsukai Chûi (2017), Character name unknown
 Kaijû Club: Kûsô Tokusatsu Seishun Ki (2017), Nishi
 Joshiteki Seikatsu (2018), Takada Kenichi
 Segodon (2018), Nakaoka Shintarō
 [[The Story of Shotaro Ishinomori, The Man Who Created a Hero (TV semi-autobiographical one-off drama)]] (2018), Kushihara;Publishing company

TV films 
 Bizarre Tales 2008 Spring Special (2008), Horibe in flashback
 Ashita mo mata ikite ikô (2010), Yusuke Yoshizaki
 Senjô Parser Himuro Natsuko: Gôka ferry satsujin jiken (2012), Jun Akita

Films 
 Godzilla, Mothra and King Ghidorah: Giant Monsters All-Out Attack(2001), Character name unknown
 Azumi (2003), Komoru
 School Wars: Hero (2004), Rogue student
 Azumi 2: Death or Love (2005), Reprises role as Komoru; Archive footage
 Gakko no Toshi Densetsu Toire no Hanako-san (2006), Character name unknown
 Parazoku: Parapara ja Naika (2006), Fujita
 Rescue the Mach Train! (2008), Reprises role as Narukami Kenji from Madan Senki Ryukendo

References

External links 

Official profile Sun Music Brain (in Japanese)

 
1983 births
Living people
Japanese male actors 

Actors from Aichi Prefecture

Twitter Account: https://twitter.com/YAMASHO_YAM_
Instagram Account: https://instagram.com/yamasho_yam